Ángel Manuel Vivar Dorado (born 12 February 1974) is a Spanish retired footballer who played mainly as an attacking midfielder.

In an 18-year professional career he represented mainly Getafe (five seasons), Tenerife (four) and Racing de Santander (four), appearing in 423 games and scoring 46 goals both major levels of Spanish football combined – 296 matches and 23 goals in La Liga alone.

Club career
Born in Madrid, Vivar Dorado began his career at local CD Leganés in the third division in 1992, with which he achieved promotion to the Segunda División in his first season. For 1994–95, he left to join CD Tenerife of La Liga.

In the summer of 1998, Vivar Dorado moved to Racing de Santander and, despite a top level relegation at the end of his third year, stayed with the club before joining top-flight Rayo Vallecano in January 2002. This was to be another short stay, as he was to return to the second tier with Getafe CF in July, helping the Madrid team attain a first-ever top flight promotion in 2004 and going on to make 161 competitive appearances during his tenure before switching to Real Valladolid in July 2007; previously, on 10 May, he was one of three players on target in a 4–0 home defeat of FC Barcelona in the semi-finals of the Copa del Rey, which meant qualification for the final for the first time ever after a 6–5 aggregate win.

On 6 January 2008, Vivar Dorado scored twice as Valladolid emerged victorious at former side Getafe, 3–0. He automatically earned a one-year extension after playing the minimum games required, being released at the end of the 2008–09 campaign at age 35 and quickly agreeing on a move to Albacete Balompié in the second division; however, he arrived injured and, after no official matches for the Castile-La Mancha club, was released from contract in January 2010 due to an Achilles tendon injury, retiring shortly after.

References

External links

1974 births
Living people
Footballers from Madrid
Spanish footballers
Association football midfielders
La Liga players
Segunda División players
Segunda División B players
CD Leganés players
CD Tenerife players
Racing de Santander players
Rayo Vallecano players
Getafe CF footballers
Real Valladolid players
Albacete Balompié players